Felsőlajos is a  village in Bács-Kiskun county, in the Southern Great Plain region of Hungary.

Geography

References

Populated places in Bács-Kiskun County